State Route 216 (SR 216) is a primary state highway in the U.S. state of Virginia. Known as Guinea Road, the state highway runs  from U.S. Route 17 (US 17) at Hayes east to SR 649 and SR 653 at Achilles in southeastern Gloucester County.

Route description

SR 216 begins at an intersection with US 17 (George Washington Memorial Highway) in the hamlet of Hayes just north of Gloucester Point. The state highway heads east as a two-lane undivided road along the height of land between the mouth of the York River to the south and the Severn River to the north. After passing through Bena, SR 216 reaches its eastern terminus at its junction with SR 649 (Maryus Road) and SR 653 (Kings Creek Road) at Achilles. SR 649 and SR 653 head toward Maryus and Severn, respectively, on the Guinea Neck.

Major intersections

References

External links

Virginia Highways Project: VA 216

216
State Route 216